Monkey Shoulder is a brand of Scotch whisky produced by William Grant & Sons in Scotland. Monkey Shoulder is a blended malt whisky, one of a small number of whiskies in this style. As of 2023, Monkey Shoulder is the world's third best-selling brand of Scotch whisky, trailing Johnnie Walker and The Macallan.

History 

Monkey Shoulder was introduced in 2003 as a brand of blended malt whisky (formerly called "vatted malt whisky") primarily for mixing, occupying a middle ground between blended Scotch (which can contain grain whisky) and single malt whisky (which cannot). Originally a blend from the Balvenie, Glenfiddich, and Kininvie distilleries, its current composition is not publicly known, although its constituent malt whiskies originate from the Speyside region.

The name refers to a repetitive strain injury that distillery workers once commonly were afflicted with after long shifts of turning malt by hand.

Blends 
 Monkey Shoulder Batch 27
 Smokey Monkey Batch 9, a blend that includes Islay whiskies

References

External links 
 Official website

2003 introductions
Scottish brands
Scottish malt whisky
William Grant & Sons